Helga Zimmermann (born 2 November 1942) is a German former swimmer. She competed in the women's 400 metre individual medley at the 1964 Summer Olympics.

References

1942 births
Living people
German female swimmers
Olympic swimmers of the United Team of Germany
Swimmers at the 1964 Summer Olympics
Sportspeople from Königsberg